The historic Algeria Shrine Temple, now also known as the Helena Civic Center, is a Moorish Revival building in Helena, Montana that was built in 1920.  The building served as a meeting hall for the Algeria Shriners and had civic functions.  It was listed on the National Register of Historic Places (under the shrine name) in 1988.

The National Register's database records "Historic subfunctions" that include "meeting hall" for the place. Today, the building has a 2,000-seat auditorium and a 15,000 sq. ft. ballroom/exhibition hall. As of 2012, it is owned and operated by the City of Helena and available for banquets, craft shows, dances, weddings, trade shows and conferences.

References

External links
 Helena Civic Center - official site
 Algeria Shriners

Clubhouses on the National Register of Historic Places in Montana
Masonic buildings completed in 1919
Moorish Revival architecture in Montana
Former Masonic buildings in Montana
Shriners
Helena
Entertainment venues in Montana